λ Lyrae, Latinized from Lambda Lyrae, is a suspected binary star system in the northern constellation of Lyra. It is an orange-hued point of light that is dimly visible to the naked eye with an apparent visual magnitude of 4.94. The system is located approximately 1,300 light years distant from the Sun based on parallax, but is drifting closer with a radial velocity of −17.7 km/s.

The visible component is an aging giant star with a stellar classification of K2.5III:Ba0.5 and an estimated age of around 58 million years. The suffix notation indicates this is a mild barium star and hence it may have a white dwarf companion, while the colon indicates there is some uncertainty about the class. Having exhausted the supply of hydrogen at its core, it has cooled and expanded off the main sequence, and now has 102 times the radius of the Sun. The star has six times the mass of the Sun and is radiating over 3,000 times the Sun's luminosity from its swollen photosphere at an effective temperature of 4,253 K.

References

K-type giants
Barium stars

Lyra (constellation)
Lyrae, Lambda
Durchmusterung objects
Lyrae, 15
176670
093279
7192